Lan Yu can refer to:

Orchid Island (Lan Yu), island off the southeast coast of Taiwan
Lan Yu (film), 2001 Chinese film directed by Stanley Kwan

People
Lan Yu (general) (died 1393), general executed by Zhu Yuanzhang during the Ming dynasty
Lan Yu (fashion designer) (born 1986), Chinese fashion designer

See also
Yu Lan (born 1921), Chinese actress